The 2023 Sydney United season is the club's 65th season since its establishment in 1958, and is participating in the NPL NSW for the 18th consecutive time.

Players

Transfers

Transfers in

Transfers out

Contract extensions

Technical staff 
Sydney United's coach for the season is Miro Vlastelica, who joined United in May 2022 and was appointed head coach until the end of the 2023 season.

Competitions

Overview 
{|class="wikitable" style="text-align:left"
|-
!rowspan=2 style="width:140px;"|Competition
!colspan=8|Record
|-
!style="width:30px;"|
!style="width:30px;"|
!style="width:30px;"|
!style="width:30px;"|
!style="width:30px;"|
!style="width:30px;"|
!style="width:30px;"|
!style="width:50px;"|
|-
|NPL NSW Men

|-
!Total

NPL NSW

Table

Results summary

Results by round

Matches

Statistics

Appearances and goals 
Players with no appearances are not included in the list.

References

External links 
 Official Page

2023 in Australian soccer
History of sport in Australia